The American Revolution is the debut studio album and second overall album by David Peel and The Lower East Side, released in 1970 through Elektra Records.

Track listing

Personnel 
Musicians
Tony Bartoli – drums
Harold C. Black – vocals, tambourine
Herb Bushler – bass guitar
Richard Grando – soprano saxophone
David Horowitz – organ
David Peel – vocals, guitar
Billy Joe White – vocals, guitar
Production and additional personnel
Joel Brodsky – photography
William S. Harvey – art direction
Robert L. Heimall – design
Stephen Y. Scheaffer – engineering
Peter K. Siegel – production, mixing, recording

References

External links 
 

1970 albums
Elektra Records albums
Albums with cover art by Joel Brodsky
David Peel (musician) albums